Lophocampa longipennis is a moth of the family Erebidae. It was described by Paul Dognin in 1908. It is found in Bolivia.

Description

References

Lophocampa longipennis at Biodiversity Heritage Library
Catalogue of the Lepidoptera Phalaenae in the British Museum S.v1-2 plates (1920)

longipennis
Moths described in 1908